Odon Marie Arsène Razanakolona (born 24 May 1946, in Fianarantsoa) is the Archbishop of the Archdiocese of Antananarivo in Antananarivo, Madagascar.

He was ordained priest on 28 December 1975 and earned a doctorate in canon law from the Pontifical Urban University in Rome in 1987, writing on "La loi de la gradualité et le mariage coutumier à Madagascar", (Urbanianum diss. 59, 1987). He was the Bishop of the Diocese of Ambanja from November 1998 until his appointment to the Archbishop seat in December 2005. Since his appointment, the seat of Bishop in Ambanja has been vacant. There is a chance that Archbishop Razanakolona, like his deceased predecessor Armand Razafindratandra and two other Archbishops of Antananarivo, may be made a Cardinal in the next consistory.

See also
Catholic Church in Madagascar

References

1946 births
Living people
People from Fianarantsoa
21st-century Roman Catholic archbishops in Madagascar
20th-century Roman Catholic bishops in Madagascar
Malagasy Roman Catholic archbishops
Malagasy Roman Catholic bishops
Roman Catholic archbishops of Antananarivo
Roman Catholic bishops of Ambanja